The 2015–16 ECHL season was the 28th season of the ECHL. The regular season schedule ran from October 16, 2015 to April 9, 2016 with the Kelly Cup playoffs to follow. Twenty-eight teams in 21 states and one Canadian province each played a 72-game schedule. The league alignment was significantly altered before the season when the American Hockey League announced the formation of a Pacific Division on January 30, 2015 displacing the ECHL teams that had been in California markets.

League business

Team changes 
As part of a massive market swap with the American Hockey League, the three California based ECHL franchises moved east into markets that the AHL had vacated.
The Bakersfield Condors relocated to Norfolk, Virginia to become the Norfolk Admirals. Norfolk hosted an AHL team of the same name the previous season. The Condors' franchise was purchased by their National Hockey League affiliate, the Edmonton Oilers, which replaced the Condors with team of the same name to play in the AHL.
The Ontario Reign relocated to Manchester, New Hampshire to become the Manchester Monarchs, replacing an AHL team of the same name. As both the Reign and Monarchs, in both their AHL and ECHL incarnations, are under the same ownership structure in the Los Angeles Kings organization, this move effectively amounts to the two franchises trading names.
The Stockton Thunder relocated to Glens Falls, New York to become the Adirondack Thunder, replacing the Adirondack Flames of the AHL who were relocated to Stockton. The Thunder were purchased by ownership group of the NHL's Calgary Flames, who already owned the Adirondack Flames, and the Thunder then become affiliated with their new AHL team, the Stockton Heat.

Two South Division teams changed names to reflect their regions:
 The Greenville, South Carolina, franchise, formerly known as the Road Warriors, changed its name to the Greenville Swamp Rabbits, a reference to the Swamp Rabbit Trail in the city.
 The Duluth, Georgia, franchise, formerly known as the Gwinnett Gladiators, changed its name to the Atlanta Gladiators to reflect the Atlanta metropolitan area instead of just Gwinnett County.

Conference realignment 
Due to the relocation of the former Californian franchises, the league's conference alignment was significantly altered. ECHL brought back the Midwest and South Divisions to increase the number of divisions from four to six, whereas the number of teams per division was reduced from seven to either four or five.

With less teams on the Pacific coast, the former Pacific Division was renamed as the West Division. The Central division lost three teams: Rapid City to the West, Brampton to the North, and Quad City to the Midwest. Former North Division teams Cincinnati, Evansville, Fort Wayne and Indy joined Quad City in the new Midwest Division.

All former East Division teams except Elmira and Reading are realigned to the new South Division with the relocated teams Adirondack, Manchester and Norfolk being placed in the East Division.

Affiliation changes 
For the 2015–16 season, all 28 ECHL teams are only allowed to have a single affiliation with an NHL team leading to many affiliation changes.

* – indicates team previously had multiple NHL/AHL affiliations and were dropped due to the new single affiliation rule

Annual Board of Governors meeting
The annual ECHL Board of Governors meeting was held at the Monte Carlo Resort and Casino in Las Vegas, Nevada, in June 2015. The ECHL Board of Governors unanimously elected Cincinnati Cyclones' president Ray Harris as chairman replacing Atlanta Gladiators' president Steve Chapman who had served as chairman for the previous seven seasons. The Board also approved of several rule changes including the change to a 3-on-3 overtime for the full five-minute duration. If still tied after overtime the shootout is decreased to three shooters per side before entering the "sudden death" format.

It was later announced that league owners voted unanimously that all 28 ECHL franchises should only allow for a single affiliation with a parent NHL team in order to give an opportunity for previously unaffiliated teams (such as those added from the Central Hockey League in 2014) to gain NHL prospects.

2016 CCM/ECHL Hockey Heritage Week
As in 2012 and 2014, the ECHL will not have a traditional All-Star Game. Instead, they will hold a Hockey Heritage Week hosted by the Kalamazoo Wings at the Wings Event Center in the city of Kalamazoo, Michigan from February 1–6, 2016. The week's theme is Past, Present, and Future and includes Hall of Fame exhibits, K-Wings throwback jerseys, alumni reunions, a youth hockey showcase, and two games between the Wings and the Toledo Walleye.

2016 Kelly Cup Playoffs format
At the end of the regular season the top team in each division will qualify for the 2016 Kelly Cup Playoffs and be seeded either 1, 2, or 3 based on highest point total earned in the season. Then the five non-division winning teams with the highest point totals in each conference will qualify for the playoffs and be seeded 4 through 8. The Kelly Cup final will pit the Eastern Conference champion against the Western Conference champion.  All four rounds will be a best-of-seven format.

Standings
Final standings.

Eastern Conference

Western Conference

 - clinched playoff spot,  - clinched regular season division title,  - Brabham Cup (regular season) champion

Postseason

Awards

All-ECHL teams
All-First Team
Josh Robinson (G) – Missouri Mavericks
Mathew Maione (D) – Wheeling Nailers
Adrian Veideman (D) – Colorado Eagles
Shane Berschbach (F) – Toledo Walleye
Chad Costello (F) – Allen Americans
Trent Daavettila (F) – Colorado Eagles

All-Second Team
Jeff Lerg (G) – Toledo Walleye
Adam Comrie (D) – Reading Royals
William Wrenn (D) – Alaska Aces
Riley Brace (F) – Wheeling Nailers
Jesse Root (F) – Missouri Mavericks
Shawn Szydlowski (F) – Fort Wayne Komets

All-Rookie Team
Vitek Vanecek (G) – South Carolina Stingrays
Jacob MacDonald (D) – Elmira Jackals
Ben Marshall (D) – Indy Fuel
Dan DeSalvo (F) – Tulsa Oilers
Cason Hohmann (F) – Elmira Jackals
Matt Willows (F) – Florida Everblades

See also 
2015 in sports
2016 in sports

References

External links
ECHL website

 
2015-16
3
3